International Superheroes of Hardcore is the first release by the American hardcore punk band of the same name.

Track listing 

 "ISHC (Theme Song)"
 "Captain Straight Edge"
 "Madball's Got Our Back"
 "Batman's a Dead Man"
 "Hardcore Hokey Pokey"
 "Ebay Revenge"
 "Superhero Sellouts"

References

2006 albums
International Superheroes of Hardcore albums